The Yamaha CP-70 is an electric piano manufactured by Yamaha Corporation between 1976 and 1985. The instrument was based on earlier electric piano technology, but took advantage of improved pickups along with the company's longstanding experience in manufacturing acoustic pianos.

The new technology and a lack of a soundboard gave it a more accurate emulation of an acoustic piano than earlier models. It was well received and used by a number of musicians in the late 1970s and early 1980s, including the Grateful Dead's Keith Godchaux and Genesis' Tony Banks. It continues to be used in the 21st century by a number of artists, and it is still possible to buy replacement parts.

Features

The CP-70 has the same key action as an acoustic piano, but does not contain a soundboard. It has a smaller number of specially manufactured strings, reducing the overall weight. In particular, the bass strings are very short compared to an acoustic instrument (27 inches instead of around nine feet). The strings are amplified by piezo-electric pickups mounted on the harp casting that induce an electric current from vibrations, in a similar manner to pickups on an acoustic guitar.

The choice of piezo-electric pickups and their mounting position avoids the problems with earlier electric pianos, where magnetic pickups carried harmonic information at a particular distance on the string. The lack of a soundboard means it is  difficult for the instrument to feedback. The signal from the pickups is sent to a preamplifier which features a stereo balanced line signal via a pair of XLR connector output jacks, in addition to the more familiar quarter-inch jack outputs.

The CP-70 is designed for touring. The instrument's legs are detachable and can be stored in an internal lid. The harp can be detached from the key assembly, though this requires two people. An optional road case is available. The CP-70s flat top allows other keyboards and synthesisers to be stacked on top of it.

Background
There had been numerous attempts to manufacturer a piano that was both portable and sounded like the acoustic grand model. Benjamin Miessner had been working on pickup and amplification techniques since the 1930s, and discovered that capturing the harmonic information and nuances of sound was difficult and changed as pickup positions and configurations were altered. Yamaha had been working on pickup technology since World War II, and took advantage of Japanese culture at the time which permitted research information to be exchanged between companies without threat of intellectual property lawsuits, as in the US. They used this knowledge to create a series of robust piezo-electric pickups, and combined it with their experience in manufacturing acoustic pianos to make an electric instrument.

The CP-70 was first manufactured in 1976, and cost $4,000. According Toto's David Paich, Yamaha invited a group of pianists in Los Angeles to test the instrument before manufacturing. After playing, they were "just freaking out over it". The first model had problems with tuning, and an upgraded version, the CP-70B, was introduced at the NAMM show in 1978, along with the CP-80, which featured a full 88-note keyboard. The CP-70D and CP-80D models featured a graphic equaliser and an effects loop. The final models to be released were the MIDI equipped CP-70M and CP-80M, which were released at the end of 1985.

Maintenance
The CP-70B and later models have very stable tuning, compared to other electric pianos. The lack of a soundboard means that vibration from transport and humidity is unlikely to change the sound.

Because the CP-70 uses custom-made strings, sourcing new ones can be problematic. Each iteration of the instrument used a different type of string, although some of the treble strings can be replaced with standard ones from an acoustic piano. As of 2019, there were two companies in the US supplying the appropriate custom strings for the CP-70.

Notable users

The CP-70 was used by a number of prominent keyboardists, including Keith Emerson, George Duke, Little Feat's Bill Payne, Heart's Howard Leese, Patrick Moraz, Michael McDonald, Magne Furuholmen of A-ha and Billy Joel. During Cold Chisel's live performances, singer Jimmy Barnes leapt onto keyboardist Don Walker's CP-70. The Grateful Dead's Keith Godchaux began playing a CP-70 as it was easier to transport one to gigs than an acoustic grand piano. Led Zeppelin's John Paul Jones encased a CP-70 inside a white case to resemble an acoustic piano. Genesis' Tony Banks used the instrument extensively, such as the hit "That's All" and "Taking It All Too Hard", and preferred recording with it over an acoustic piano.

The CP-70 achieved its commercial peak during the advent of MTV and was therefore prominently featured on music videos. Keane's Tim Rice-Oxley uses a CP-70 as his main instrument with the band. Alicia Keys has used a CP-70 as her main touring piano, which she custom-painted. During the tour for The Element of Freedom, her CP-70 featured the words "Freedom" and "Love" painted on its side.

References
References

Sources

 
 

Electric pianos
Yamaha music products